Scottown may refer to:

 Scottown, Ohio, unincorporated community in Ohio (USA)
 Scottown, Florida, small unincorporated community in Florida
 Scottown Covered Bridge

See also
 Scotstown (disambiguation)
 Scotto, a name
 Scotton (disambiguation)
 Scottow, Norfolk, England